Diana Carolina Zenteno Franco (born 6 January 1993) is a Bolivian footballer who plays as a midfielder for Mundo Futuro. She has been a member of the Bolivia women's national team.

International career
Zenteno capped for Bolivia at senior level during the 2010 South American Women's Football Championship.

References

1993 births
Living people
Women's association football midfielders
Bolivian women's footballers
Bolivia women's international footballers